Skvorchikha is a rural locality (a selo) and the administrative centre of Skvorchikhinsky Selsoviet, Ishimbaysky District, Bashkortostan, Russia. The population was 459 as of 2010. There are 7 streets.

Geography 
Skvorchikha is located 21 km southeast of Ishimbay (the district's administrative centre) by road. Novonikolayevka is the nearest rural locality.

References 

Rural localities in Ishimbaysky District